After the Morning may refer to:
 After the Morning (Cara Dillon album), 2006
 After the Morning (1979 John Hicks album)
 After the Morning (1992 John Hicks album)
 After the Morning (Katie McMahon album), by Katie McMahon (1998)
 After the Morning (The Sands Family album), 1976